The 2014 Horizon League baseball tournament was held from May 21 through 24.  All six of the league's teams met in the double-elimination tournament held at Kapco Park on the campus of Concordia University Wisconsin in Milwaukee.  Youngstown State won the tournament for the second time, earning the conference's automatic bid to the 2014 NCAA Division I baseball tournament.

Seeding and format
The league's six teams were seeded one through six based on winning percentage, using conference games only.  They then played a double-elimination tournament, with the top two seeds (top-seeded Wright State and UIC) earning a single bye.

Bracket

All-Tournament Team
The following players were named to the All-Tournament Team. Youngstown State second baseman Phil Lipari, one of five Penguins selected, was named Most Valuable Player.

References

Tournament
Horizon League Baseball Tournament
Horizon League baseball tournament
Horizon League baseball tournament
College sports tournaments in Wisconsin
2010s in Milwaukee
Baseball competitions in Milwaukee